Kerr Hall is a series of four buildings in a square, surrounding Ryerson Community Park, on the campus of Toronto Metropolitan University (formerly Ryerson University) in Toronto, Canada. Kerr Hall is on the site of the former Toronto Normal School. All but a portion of the Normal School's front façade was demolished in the late 1950s to enable the construction of:

 Kerr Hall East: 340 Church Street and 60 Gould Street.
 Kerr Hall West: 379 Victoria Street.
 Kerr Hall North: 31 and 43 Gerrard Street East.
 Kerr Hall South: 40 and 50 Gould Street.

The current building was built from the early 1960s to 1969 and designed by architect Burwell R. Coon. Until 1963, Kerr Hall surrounded the site of the Toronto Normal School.

The middle of Kerr Hall is the tree-lined Ryerson Community Park, also known as the Quad.

Kerr Hall is named for Ryerson's first principal, Howard Hillen Kerr.

The Theatre at The Creative School
The northwest corner of Kerr Hall North houses The Theatre at The Creative School, formerly Ryerson Theatre. The 1,237-seat auditorium is used for "live productions, lectures, product launches, convocations, fashion shows and film shoots". It also hosts screenings of films during the Toronto International Film Festival.

The Theatre has hosted
 film premieres including The Princess Bride in 1987 and Borat (2006)
 the 1976 Juno Awards
 the 28th Canadian Film Awards (1977)
 the Atkinson Lecture Series.

Source: Toronto Metropolitan University

Dance performances have included:
 Fall for Dance North series - Indigenous Enterprise program "Indigenous Liberation" October 2022

Musical concerts have included:
 Japan - November 1979
 CJRT Festival Series

Theatre performances by the Ryerson Theatre Company have included:
 Twelfth Night, November 1977

Floor plans and navigation

Not all four of Kerr Hall's buildings connect to each other on all floors. You cannot pass through the Theatre.

Google Maps offers indoor maps for all four floors of Kerr Hall, plus the basement. Many room numbers are omitted from the map, and the entire 100 level of Kerr Hall West is also missing.

Google indoor maps provide static floor plans; they can also provide spoken walking directions to selected rooms inside a building. Google Maps can use Wi-Fi trilateration in order to determine a user's position; it can achieve an indoor accuracy of between 5–15 meters in many commercial and institutional buildings.

References

Toronto Metropolitan University buildings
Clock towers in Canada
Towers in Ontario
Cinemas and movie theatres in Toronto